Atira can refer to:

 a titular diocese of the Catholic Church in the area of Büyükçekmece, a district in the suburbs of Istanbul
 163693 Atira, an asteroid
 Atira asteroids
 Atira (goddess), goddess of the Earth and wife of Tirawa, the creator god, in Pawnee mythology

ATIRA can refer to:
 Ahmedabad Textile Industry's Research Association
 Atira Property Management a property management company managing Public housing in Vancouver
 Atira Women’s Resource Society a society that supports women and children in crisis in Vancouver